Great Bardfield is a large village in the Braintree district of Essex, England.

The village came to national attention during the 1950s as home to the Great Bardfield Artists.

History
Henry VIII is said to have given Bardfield to Anne of Cleves as part of his divorce settlement and a number of buildings in the village are associated with Anne of Cleves, including the Grade II-listed Great Lodge and its associated Grade I-listed barn, now named after her. The  grounds include a Grade I-listed barn and a vineyard. Great Bardfield is home to the Bardfield Cage, a 19th-century village lock-up, and the Gibraltar Mill, a windmill which has been converted to a house.

Great Bardfield played an important role in the history of the oxlip (Primula elatior) which, in the UK, is a rare plant only found where Suffolk, Essex and Cambridgeshire meet. Originally it was thought that oxlips were cowslip-primrose hybrids but in 1842 Henry Doubleday and Charles Darwin conducted tests on plants collected from Great Bardfield and concluded that this was not so. For a while the plant was known as the Bardfield Oxlip. The common cowslip-primrose hybrid is known as the false oxlip (Primula × polyantha).

Great Bardfield Artists

Bardfield was the home of many important twentieth-century English artists who hosted a series of important 'open house' exhibitions in the village during the 1950s. These exhibitions garnered national press attention and attracted thousands of visitors. The Great Bardfield Artists of the 1940s and 1950s were: John Aldridge, Edward Bawden, George Chapman, Stanley Clifford-Smith, Audrey Cruddas, Walter Hoyle, Michael Rothenstein, Eric Ravilious (who lodged with Bawden at Brick House), Sheila Robinson and Marianne Straub. Other artists linked to the art community include Joan Glass, Duffy Ayers, Laurence Scarfe and the political cartoonist David Low.

Other notable people
The 14th-century judge in Ireland, William of Bardfield, was born in the village in around 1258, the son of a local householder, Walter of Bardfield.
William Bendlowes (1516–1584), Serjeant-at-Law to Mary I and Elizabeth I
Early 20th-century Liberal candidate in several local constituencies, Ernest William Tanner.
Artist Grayson Perry spent part of his childhood in the village, and worked for a while as the local paperboy. 
Alan Jordan, former Sheriff of Essex and the founder of Great Bardfield vineyard.
Arthur Lindsay Sadler, Professor of Oriental Studies (1922–48) at the University of Sydney, spent his retirement in the village
Sir Christopher Sibthorpe (died 1632), judge in Ireland and religious polemicist, and his brother Robert Sibthorp, Bishop of Limerick, were born in the village.

Village events
Each year there is a village garage sale.

See also
The Hundred Parishes

References

External links

Great Bardfield Primary School
Information on Great Bardfield
Great Bardfield Garage Sale

Gallery

 
Villages in Essex
Civil parishes in Essex
Braintree District